Versailles refers to the Palace of Versailles, a royal  in Versailles in the  region of France.

Versailles, Versaille, Versalles, or Versalle may also refer to:

Places

France
 Versailles, Yvelines, a town and a suburb of Paris, France; which contains the palace
  of Versailles, which contains the town
 , a train station there, on the intercity line to Normandy and Brittany, amongst others
 Versailles Cathedral, a Roman Catholic church located in Versailles, France
 , a train station there, on RER line C

United States
 Versailles, a village in Sprague, Connecticut
 Versailles (house), an unfinished mansion located in Windermere, Florida
 Versailles, Illinois, a village in Brown County
 Versailles Township, Brown County, Illinois, which contains the village
 Versailles, Indiana
 Versailles State Park near Versailles, Indiana
 Versailles, Kentucky
 Versailles, Louisiana
 Versailles, Missouri
 Versailles, New York
 Versailles, Ohio
 Versailles High School, a school in Versailles, Ohio
 Versailles, Pennsylvania
 Versailles, Tennessee
 Versailles (Burgess, Virginia)
 North Versailles Township, Allegheny County, Pennsylvania
 South Versailles Township, Allegheny County, Pennsylvania

Other places
 Versalles, Buenos Aires, Argentina
 , Colombia
 Versailles Lake, one of a maze of lakes in northwestern Saskatchewan, Canada

Cities nicknamed "Versailles"
 , Poland, Versailles of Podlachia
  or Eastern New Orleans, New Orleans, Louisiana, a neighborhood known locally as "Versailles"

Arts, entertainment, and media

Music
 Versailles (musician), American singer-songwriter
 Versailles (band), a Japanese metal band
 Versailles (album), the self-titled fourth, and final, studio album by Versailles band

Other arts, entertainment, and media
 Versailles (film), a French film in the 2008 Cannes Film Festival
 Versailles (TV series), a 2015 Franco-Canadian historical television series
 Versailles 1685, a video game
 Versailles (play), a 2014 play by the Welsh playwright Peter Gill

Businesses & Institutions
 FC Versailles 78, a French semi-professional association football club
 Place Versailles, a super regional mall in Montreal, Quebec, Canada
 Versailles Group plc, a London-based mezzanine finance institution that went bankrupt amidst a fraud scandal
 Versailles restaurant, a restaurant in Little Havana, Miami, Florida
 Versailles (restaurant chain), a chain of restaurants from Los Angeles

Automobiles
 Ford Versailles (France), an automobile produced in France between 1954 and 1957
 Ford Versailles, an automobile produced in Brazil between 1992 and 1996
 Lincoln Versailles, American luxury automobile produced 1977–1980

Other uses
 Versailles wedding hall disaster, a 2001 building collapse that killed 23 in Talpiot, Jerusalem

See also 

 
 
 
 
 
 
 Ghost of Versailles (disambiguation)
 Treaty of Versailles (disambiguation)
 Versailles Township (disambiguation)